The Precision 27 is an American sailboat that was designed by Jim Taylor as a cruiser and first built in 1989.

The design was later developed into the Precision 28 by extending the transom and installing a swimming step.

Production
The design was built by Precision Boat Works in Palmetto, Florida, United States, starting in 1989, but it is now out of production. Only a small number were built.

Design
The Precision 27 is a recreational keelboat, built predominantly of fiberglass, with wood trim. It has a fractional sloop rig, a raked stem, a plumb transom, an internally mounted spade-type rudder controlled by a tiller or optional wheel and a fixed fin keel with a lead bulb weight. It displaces  and carries  of ballast.

The fuel tank holds .

The design has sleeping accommodation for four people, with a double "V"-berth in the bow cabin and an aft cabin with a double berth on the port side. The galley is located on the port side just forward of the companionway ladder. The galley is "L"-shaped and is equipped with a two-burner stove, ice box and a sink. A navigation station is opposite the galley, on the starboard side. The head is located beside the companionway on the starboard side and includes a sink.

Operational history
The designer notes, "the boats are comfortable and sailed well, and are quite popular with their owners."

See also
List of sailing boat types

References

External links
Photo of a Precision 27

Keelboats
1980s sailboat type designs
Sailing yachts
Sailboat type designs by Jim Taylor Yacht Designs
Sailboat types built by Precision Boat Works